An 800-word, untitled short story, unofficially known as the Harry Potter prequel, was written by J. K. Rowling in 2008 as part of a charity auction event, for which it fetched £25,000. It was published as part of  What's Your Story Postcard Collection. The story recounts an encounter with Muggle police experienced by Sirius Black and James Potter, taking place before the events of the Harry Potter series. The manuscript was stolen in 2017.

Synopsis
Two Muggle policemen chase a speeding motorbike into a dead-end alley, cornering its riders: Sirius Black and James Potter. As the policemen confront the pair, three men fly down the alley on broomsticks. James and Sirius magically upend the policemen's car and the broomsticks crash into it, rendering their riders insensible. As the policemen clutch at each other in fear, Sirius and James return to their motorbike, which flies away.

Rowling concludes the story card with the words, "From the prequel I am not working on – but that was fun!"

History

Background
On 11 June 2008, Waterstones held a charity event called "What's Your Story?". Thirteen authors, including Rowling, were invited to write stories on an A5 card for auction with proceeds going to English PEN and Dyslexia Action. Rowling's card was sold for £25,000 to Hira Digpal, president of Tokyo-based investment-banking consulting company Red-33. The total raised from the sale of all thirteen cards was £47,150.

Theft
In April 2017, the manuscript of the prequel was stolen during a burglary in Birmingham.  Rowling tweeted about the incident, asking fans not to buy the work if offered it, and West Midlands Police appealed for information.

The burglary victim told the BBC that the work was "priceless" and had the potential to raise money for additional good causes, if it were to be sold again legitimately. "I don't think whoever took it or stole it or who might purchase it will really understand the benefits to people out there, what it can do," he said. "If it's destroyed, or if it's lost, it's a great loss."

References

External links

Official statement on J.K. Rowling's official website, 29 May 2008

Prequel
Prequel
2008 short stories
Fantasy short stories
Prequel novels